Dmitriyevka is a rural locality (a village) in Dmitriyevsky Selsoviet, Zilairsky District, Bashkortostan, Russia. The population was 224 as of 2010. There are 6 streets.

Geography 
Dmitriyevka is located 29 km northwest of Zilair (the district's administrative centre) by road. Saratovsky is the nearest rural locality.

References 

Rural localities in Zilairsky District